John Åke J:son Rusck (9 August 1912 – 24 September 1978) was a Swedish businessman.

He was CEO of Sweden's major state hydro power company Vattenfall between 1948 and 1957 and then CEO of the SAS Group from 1958 to 1961.

He was elected a member of the Royal Swedish Academy of Engineering Sciences in 1950.

References 

1912 births
1978 deaths
SAS Group people
Swedish airline chief executives
Members of the Royal Swedish Academy of Engineering Sciences
People from Valdemarsvik Municipality
20th-century Swedish businesspeople